"I'm Going Slightly Mad" is a song by the British rock band Queen. Written by Freddie Mercury but credited to Queen, with uncredited lyrical contributions by Peter Straker, it was released as the second single from the band's 1991 album Innuendo. The song was released as a single on 4 March 1991, a month after the release of the album. The lyrics and the accompanying music video project the song as humorous and light-hearted, despite the lyrics dealing with the mental decline Mercury was experiencing as one of the effects of advancing AIDS.

The single cover was inspired by a Grandville illustration (as are the others from the album).

Background
"I'm Going Slightly Mad" had been mentioned by John Deacon in a letter printed in the Queen Fan Club magazine of Spring 1990. Deacon revealed that work was being done on the song, calling it the "whacky single." Mercury composed the song; he had the song's title in mind before anything else. During an evening with his friend Peter Straker, Mercury explained his idea for the song, which he wanted to feature lyrics of tongue-in-cheek one liners inspired by Noël Coward. The pair then spent the night coming up with such lines.

In his 1994 book Mercury and Me, Mercury's partner Jim Hutton recalled: 

During 1991, Mercury recorded a short, "Totally Bonkers" version of the song as a message for Queen's 1991 fan club convention. The version, less than a minute in length, features different instrumentation, lyrics and vocal than that used in the main, full Queen recording of the song.

Video
The accompanying videodirected by Rudi Dolezal and Hannes Rossacher of DoRo Productions, like all other Innuendo videos was filmed in February 1991 at Limehouse Studios. Costumes were created by Diana Moseley. It features the band dressed and acting in an absurd and surreal manner, including guitarist Brian May dressed as a penguin (a reprise of his outfit featured in the booklet of the first Queen album), drummer Roger Taylor wearing a tea kettle on his head and riding a tricycle while Mercury sneaks up on him and is chasing him, a man in a gorilla suit (rumored to be Elton John), bassist John Deacon as a jester, and Mercury wearing a bunch of bananas as a wig, which corresponds with the line "I think I'm a banana tree".

"I'm Going Slightly Mad" is the last Queen video to feature significant creative input from Mercury. He was already considerably ill at the time due to AIDS, which would claim his life less than a year later. Despite this, the viewer sees Mercury as very mobile and expressive in the scenes of the video. He even actively co-directed some of the video's storyboards. Mercury wore thick make-up to cover up the blotches on his face, and an extra layer of clothing underneath to conceal his weight loss. He also wore a wig, which covered his receding hairline, and a suit, both in the goth-inspired style popular at the time.

In contrast, in the video for "These Are the Days of Our Lives", the last music video which Mercury ever filmed (in May 1991), he hardly moved around at all, as his condition had deteriorated further. However, both of these videos were shot in black and white.

Track listings
7-inch single
A. "I'm Going Slightly Mad" – 4:22
B. "The Hitman" – 4:56

12-inch and CD single
 "I'm Going Slightly Mad" – 4:22
 "The Hitman" – 4:56
 "Lost Opportunity" – 3:51

Personnel

 Freddie Mercury – lead, and backing vocals, keyboard, piano, sampler
 Brian May – electric guitar, slide guitar
 Roger Taylor – drums, maracas, bar chimes
 John Deacon – bass guitar

Charts

References

External links
 
 Lyrics at Queen official website

Queen (band) songs
1991 singles
1991 songs
British synth-pop songs
Gothic rock songs
Hollywood Records singles
Parlophone singles
Songs about mental health
Songs written by Freddie Mercury